The 36th Arizona State Legislature, consisting of the Arizona State Senate and the Arizona House of Representatives, was constituted in Phoenix from January 1, 1983, to December 31, 1984, during the first two years of Bruce Babbitt's second full term as Governor of Arizona. Both the Senate and the House membership remained constant at 30 and 60, respectively. The Republicans increased their lead in the Senate by two seats, giving them an 18–12 edge in the upper house, while the Democrats gained four seats in the lower house, although the Republicans still held a 39–21 majority.

Sessions
The Legislature met for two regular sessions at the State Capitol in Phoenix. The first opened on January 10, 1983, and adjourned on April 27, while the Second Regular Session convened on January 9, 1984, and adjourned sine die on May 4.

There were three Special Sessions during this legislature. The first convened on October 3, 1983, and adjourned sine die on January 19, 1984; the second convened on June 24, 1984, and adjourned on July 5; the third convened later that same month on July 20 and adjourned sine die later that same day.

State Senate

Members

The asterisk (*) denotes members of the previous Legislature who continued in office as members of this Legislature.

House of Representatives

Members 
The asterisk (*) denotes members of the previous Legislature who continued in office as members of this Legislature.

The ** denotes that Hull was the incumbent representative from the 19th district, who moved to the 18th district

The *** denotes that Davis was the incumbent representative from the 25th district, who moved to the 20th district

The **** denotes that Kenney and Rockwell were the incumbent representatives from the 21st district, who moved to the 25th district

References

Arizona legislative sessions
1983 in Arizona
1984 in Arizona
1983 U.S. legislative sessions
1984 U.S. legislative sessions